The Kweneng Regional Football Association Division One League, also known as the KRFA Division One, is one of the regional leagues that make up the third tier of Botswana football. It is administered by the Kweneng Regional Football Association and features teams from Kweneng District.

Clubs
List of clubs in the 2019–20 KRFA:
Majweng
Kumakwane United (Kumakwane)
Moritshane Lions
VTM Security
Mmopane (Mmopane)
Walker XI
Lesirane City (Lesirane)
Metsimotlhabe (Metsimotlhabe)
Molmas
Sanyane Celtics
Cubs
Sweet XI
Thamaga (Thamaga)
Molepolole Tigers (Molepolole)
African Birds
Dintoronkong

Past seasons

References

Football leagues in Botswana